A list of events in the year 2014 in Belize.

Incumbents 
 Governor General: Sir Colville Young
 Prime Minister: Dean Barrow

Events 
 February – Raonel Valdez-Valhuerdis, a fugitive from the US, was arrested in Belize still wearing his ankle monitor while attempting to enter the country illegally from Guatemala.  Valdez was accused of the largest gold robbery (110 pounds) in Florida history in 2012.
 24 March – European Union bans fish imports from Belize due to alleged illegal fishing.
 24 December – Research of sediments in the Great Blue Hole finds evidence that the Mayan civilization collapsed because of drought.

Deaths 
 26 May – Marcial Mes, politician (b. c. 1949)
 22 October – Paul Nabor, singer and musician, (b. 1928).

References

 
2014 in Central America
2010s in Belize
Years of the 21st century in Belize